The Cowboy Capital Rollergirls (CCR) was a women's flat track roller derby league based in Stephenville, Texas. Founded in 2011, the league consisted of two teams which compete against teams from other leagues.

History
By May 2012, the league had twenty-five skaters.  In January 2013, it grew further, after the Brown County Debu'Taunts merged with Cowboy Capital.

Cowboy Capital was accepted as a member of the Women's Flat Track Derby Association Apprentice Program in January 2013, and it became a full WFTDA member in September 2013.  This was described by league president Ashley Gill as "such a huge milestone not just for us but for our community".

The league was entirely volunteer-run, and has raised large amounts for charity: around $10,000 in 2013.

The last game skated by the A team Pistol Annies was a 280-113 loss to Assassination City Roller Derby in March 2015, and Cowboy Capital was last listed as a ranked WFTDA member with the March 31, 2015 release, in which they were ranked at #230 out of then 238 ranked leagues.

WFTDA rankings

References

Roller derby leagues established in 2011
Roller derby leagues in Texas
Erath County, Texas
Women's Flat Track Derby Association Division 3
Former Women's Flat Track Derby Association leagues
2011 establishments in Texas